A fishing dredge, also known as a scallop dredge or oyster dredge, is a kind of dredge which is towed along the bottom of the sea by a fishing boat in order to collect a targeted edible bottom-dwelling species. The gear is used to fish for scallops, oysters and other species of clams, crabs, and sea cucumber. The dredge is then winched up into the boat and emptied. Dredges are also used in connection with the work of the naturalist in marine biology, notably on the Challenger Expedition.

Construction

The dredge is usually constructed from a heavy steel frame in the form of a scoop. The frame is covered with chain mesh which is open on the front, which is towed. The chain mesh functions as a net.

Dredges may or may not have teeth along the bottom bar of the frame. In Europe, early dredges had teeth, called tynes, at the bottom. These teeth raked or ploughed the sand and mud, digging up buried clams. This design was improved by using spring-loaded teeth that reduced bottom snagging, and so could be used over rough ground. The New Bedford (USA) dredge does not have teeth.

Dredge nets have a coarse mesh in order to let organisms smaller than the target species through. The net catches the larger organisms: in the case of scallop dredging that includes the scallops' predators, such as whelks, starfish and octopus.

In some cases, several dredges are attached to a wheeled rigid axle in groups of three or four. A number of these dredges can be towed from a heavy spreading bar, usually one from each side of the vessel.  The length of the bar and number of dredges towed depends on the power of the vessel and the room on the side deck for working the dredges.  The number might be three on each side of a small  boat up to 20 on each side for a  vessel with 1500 hp. The great weight and strength of the gear can disturb the ground it is towed over, overturning rocks and dislodging and crushing organisms in its path.

Like a better mouse trap, there is still a challenge for inventors to produce a kinder and more gentle scallop dredge.

Types of dredgers

Dredging history

Dredging art

See also
 
 
 
 
 Oyster dredging boats:

Notes

References

 National Research Council (US) (2002) Effects of Trawling and Dredging on Seafloor Habitat. Committee on Ecosystem Effects of Fishing. 
 Hall-Spencer & Moore PG (2000) Scallop dredging has profound, long-term impacts on maerl beds. ICES Journal of Marine Science. 57, 1407-1415.

External links 

 photo of scallop dredge
 drawing  of scallop dredge
 Annual oyster dredging match at West Mersea

Fishing industry
Nautical terminology